Enterprise Building may refer to:

Enterprise Building (Worcester, Massachusetts), listed on the National Register of Historic Places in Worcester County, Massachusetts
Enterprise Building (High Point, North Carolina), listed on the National Register of Historic Places in Guilford County, North Carolina
Enterprise Building (Palmyra, Wisconsin), listed on the National Register of Historic Places in Jefferson County, Wisconsin